Pedra Talhada Biological Reserve is a federally administered biological reserve in eastern Brazil.
It contains a remnant of the tropical Atlantic Forest biome.

History

The Pedra Talhada State Park was created in 1985 to protect a representative sample of the remaining Atlantic Forest ecosystem in the Serras of Guaribas, Pedra Talhada and Serra do Cavaleiro.
Due to lack of resources, the park was not implemented, and there was no protection against commercial forestry or subsistence cropping and grazing. 
To address the problem, the Pedra Talhada Biological Reserve was created on 13 December 1989 in the municipalities of Quebrangulo in the state of Alagoas and of Lagoa do Ouro in the state of Pernambuco.

Environment

Temperatures are around  year round.
The reserve has a rugged topography, with most of its terrain strongly undulating and hilly.
The Lajeado dos Bois, at  has the highest elevation of the state of Alagoas.
As of 2006 the park was still being used for subsistence crops and livestock, with fire used to clear the land and renew the pasture.

Status

Protected bird species are white-necked hawk (Buteogallus lacernulatus), rufous gnateater (Conopophaga lineata), scalloped antbird (Myrmeciza ruficauda), spot-winged wood quail (Odontophorus capueira), golden-spangled piculet (Picumnus exilis) and Alagoas tyrannulet (Phylloscartes ceciliae).

References

Sources

Biological reserves of Brazil
Protected areas of Alagoas
Protected areas of Pernambuco
Protected areas of the Atlantic Forest
1989 establishments in Brazil
Protected areas established in 1989